Appelt may refer to:

Dieter Appelt (born 1935), Austrian photographer
Ingo Appelt (born 1961), Austrian bobsledder
Ingo Appelt (comedian) (born 1967), German comedian
Josh Appelt (born 1983), American mixed martial artist
Kathi Appelt (born 1954), American writer

See also 
Apelt

Surnames from given names